This is a list of cathedrals in Canada, that is, seats of bishops in episcopal denominations, including the Catholic Church, Anglican Church of Canada, Eastern Orthodox Churches and the Armenian Apostolic Church.

Alberta
St. Mary's Cathedral, in Calgary (Roman Catholic)
Cathedral Church of the Redeemer, in Calgary (Anglican)
All Saints' Anglican Cathedral in Edmonton (Anglican)
All Saints' Orthodox Cathedral in Edmonton (Autonomous Orthodox Metropolia of North & South America & the British Isles)
St. Barbara's Cathedral in Edmonton (Russian Orthodox Church in Canada)
St. Joseph's Basilica, in Edmonton  (Roman Catholic)
St. Josaphat's Cathedral, in Edmonton (Ukrainian Catholic)
St. John Cathedral in Edmonton  (Ukrainian Orthodox)
Saint-Jean-Baptiste Cathedral, in McLennan  (Roman Catholic)
St. James' Cathedral, in Peace River (Anglican)
St. Paul's Cathedral, in St. Paul  (Roman Catholic)
St. Vladimir's Russian Orthodox Cathedral in Edmonton (Church of the Genuine Orthodox Christians of America)

British Columbia
Cathedral Church of St. Michael and All Angels, in Kelowna (Anglican)
St. Saviour's Pro-Cathedral, in Nelson (Anglican)
St. Saviour's was the Cathedral for the Diocese of Kootenay until 1987, when St. Michael and All Angels' was consecrated by the Rt. Rev'd R.E.F. Berry as the new Cathedral for the Diocese.
Christ Church Cathedral, in Vancouver (Anglican)
Christ Church Cathedral, in Victoria (Anglican)
Mary Immaculate Cathedral, in Nelson (Roman Catholic)
Holy Eucharist Cathedral, in Vancouver (Ukrainian Catholic)
Holy Rosary Cathedral, in Vancouver (Roman Catholic)
Holy Trinity Cathedral, in New Westminster (Anglican)
Cathedral for the diocese of New Westminster until 1929 (now a parish church).  
The cathedral for New Westminster diocese is currently Christ Church Cathedral in Vancouver (since 1929).
Holy Trinity Ukrainian Orthodox Cathedral in Vancouver (Ukrainian Orthodox)
Sacred Heart Cathedral, in Kamloops (Roman Catholic)
Sacred Heart Cathedral, in Prince George (Roman Catholic)
St. Andrew's Cathedral, in Prince Rupert (Anglican)
St. Andrew's Cathedral, in Victoria (Roman Catholic)
St. George's Greek Orthodox Cathedral, in Vancouver (Greek Orthodox)
St. Paul's Cathedral, in Kamloops (Anglican)
Cathedral of Saint John the Evangelist, in Victoria (Anglican Catholic)

Manitoba
St. Matthew's Cathedral, in Brandon (Anglican)
Our Lady of the Sacred Heart Cathedral, in The Pas (Roman Catholic)
Saint-Boniface Cathedral, in Winnipeg (Roman Catholic)
Cathedral of St. John, in Winnipeg (Anglican)
St. Mary's Cathedral, in Winnipeg (Roman Catholic) 
Cathedral of Sts. Vladimir and Olga, in Winnipeg (Ukrainian Greek Catholic)
Holy Trinity Metropolitan Cathedral in Winnipeg (Ukrainian Orthodox)

New Brunswick
Sacré-Coeur Cathedral, in Bathurst (Roman Catholic)
Immaculée-Conception Cathedral, in Edmundston (Roman Catholic)
Christ Church Cathedral, in Fredericton (Anglican)
Notre-Dame-de-l'Assomption Cathedral, in Moncton (Roman Catholic)
Cathedral of the Immaculate Conception (Saint John, New Brunswick), in Saint John (Roman Catholic)
St. Michael's Basilica, in Miramichi (Roman Catholic)

Newfoundland and Labrador
Holy Redeemer Cathedral, in Corner Brook (Roman Catholic)
Cathedral Church of St. John the Evangelist, in Corner Brook (Anglican)
Cathedral of the Immaculate Conception, in Harbour Grace (Roman Catholic)
St. Martin's Cathedral, in Gander (Anglican)
Immaculate Conception Cathedral, in Grand Falls-Windsor (Roman Catholic)
Basilica of Our Lady of Perpetual Help, in Labrador City (Roman Catholic)
Basilica of St. John the Baptist, in St. John's (Roman Catholic)
Cathedral of St. John the Baptist, in St. John's (Anglican)

Northwest Territories
Saint-Joseph Cathedral, in Fort Smith (Roman Catholic)

Nova Scotia
St. Ninian's Cathedral, in Antigonish (Roman Catholic)
All Saints' Cathedral, in Halifax (Anglican)
St. Mary's Basilica, in Halifax (Roman Catholic)
St. Ambrose co-Cathedral, in Yarmouth (Roman Catholic)
St. Aidan's pro-Cathedral, in Halifax (Anglican)

Nunavut
St. Jude's Cathedral, in Iqaluit (Anglican)

Ontario
St. Finnan's Basilica, in Alexandria (Roman Catholic)
St Matthew's Cathedral in Cambridge (Independent Anglican Church Canada Synod)
St. Alphonsa Cathedral in Mississauga (Syro-Malabar Catholic)
Co-Cathedral of the Nativity, in Cornwall (Roman Catholic)
Christ's Church Cathedral, in Hamilton (Anglican)
Christ the King Cathedral, in Hamilton (Roman Catholic)
Notre-Dame-de-l'Assomption Cathedral, in Hearst (Roman Catholic)
St. Alban's Cathedral, in Kenora (Anglican)
St. George's Cathedral, in Kingston (Anglican)
St. Mary's Cathedral, in Kingston (Roman Catholic)
St. Paul's Cathedral, in London (Anglican)
St. Peter's Cathedral, in London (Roman Catholic)
Cathedral of the Transfiguration of Our Lord, in Markham (Slovak Byzantine Catholic)
Cathedral of the Nativity of the Mother of God (Slovak Byzantine Catholic)
Christ the King Cathedral, in Moosonee (Roman Catholic)
Trinity Reformed Episcopal Church Cathedral, in New Liskeard
Pro-Cathedral of the Assumption, in North Bay (Roman Catholic)
Cathedral of the Annunciation in Ottawa (Anglican Catholic)
Christ Church Cathedral, in Ottawa (Anglican)
Holy Trinity Cathedral, in Ottawa (Orthodox)
Notre-Dame Cathedral Basilica, in Ottawa (Roman Catholic)
St. Patrick's Basilica, in Ottawa (Roman Catholic)
St. Columbkille Cathedral, in Pembroke (Roman Catholic)
Cathedral of St. Peter-in-Chains, in Peterborough (Roman Catholic)
Cathedral of St. Catherine of Alexandria, in St. Catharines (Roman Catholic)
Precious Blood Cathedral, in Sault Ste. Marie (Roman Catholic)
St. Patrick Cathedral, in Thunder Bay (Roman Catholic)
Cathedral of St. Anthony of Padua, in Timmins (Roman Catholic)
St. Michael's Cathedral, in Toronto (Roman Catholic)
St. Josaphat's Cathedral, in Toronto (Ukrainian Catholic)
St. John's Cathedral, in Toronto (Polish National Catholic Church)
Cathedral Church of St. James, in Toronto (Anglican)
Cathedral of the Annunciation of the Virgin Mary, in Toronto (Greek Orthodox)
Holy Trinity Cathedral, in Toronto (Russian Orthodox Church Outside Russia)
Christ the Saviour Cathedral, in Toronto (Orthodox Church in America)
St. Clement of Ohrid Cathedral, in Toronto (Macedonian Orthodox)
St. Volodymyr's Cathedral, in Toronto (Ukrainian Orthodox)
Ss. Cyril and Methodius Cathedral, in Toronto (Macedonian-Bulgarian Orthodox)
 St Mark's Coptic Orthodox Church (Markham) under construction from 2007 to 2008

Prince Edward Island
Cathedral Basilica of St. Dunstan, in Charlottetown (Roman Catholic)
St. Peter's Cathedral, Charlottetown (Anglican)

Quebec
Sainte-Thérèse-d'Avila Cathedral, in Amos (Roman Catholic)
Saint-Jean-Eudes Cathedral, in Baie-Comeau (Roman Catholic)
Sainte-Amélie Pro-Cathedral, in Baie-Comeau (Roman Catholic)
Saint-François-Xavier Cathedral, in Saguenay (Chicoutimi), (Roman Catholic)
Christ-Roi Cathedral, in Gaspé (Roman Catholic)
Saint-Jean-Marie-Vianney Cathedral, in Gatineau (Roman Catholic)
Saint-Joseph Co-Cathedral, in Gatineau (Roman Catholic)
Saint-Charles-Borromée Cathedral, in Joliette (Roman Catholic)
Notre-Dame-de-Fourvière Cathedral, in Mont-Laurier (Roman Catholic)
St. Gregory the Illuminator Cathedral in Montreal (Armenian Church in Canada) (Etchmiadzin)
Saint Hagop Cathedral in Montreal (Armenian Prelacy of Canada) (Cilicia)
Christ Church Anglican Cathedral, in Montreal (Anglican)
Marie-Reine-du-Monde - Saint-Jacques Cathedral Basilica, in Montreal (Roman Catholic)
St. Sophie Cathedral, in Montreal (Ukrainian Orthodox)
Saint-Sauveur Cathedral, in Montreal (Greek-Melkite Catholic)
Saint-Maron Cathedral, in Montreal (Maronite Catholic)
Saint-Jean-Baptiste Cathedral, in Nicolet (Roman Catholic)
Notre-Dame-de-Québec Cathedral Basilica, in Quebec City (Roman Catholic)
Holy Trinity Cathedral, in Quebec City (Anglican)
Saint-Germain Cathedral, in Rimouski (Roman Catholic)
Saint-Joseph Cathedral, in Rouyn-Noranda (Roman Catholic)
Saint-Michel-Archange Former Cathedral, in Rouyn-Noranda (Roman Catholic)
Sainte-Anne Cathedral, in Sainte-Anne-de-la-Pocatière (Roman Catholic)
Saint-Hyacinthe-le-Confesseur Cathedral, in Saint-Hyacinthe (Roman Catholic)
Saint-Matthieu Pro-Cathedral, in Saint-Hyacinthe (Roman Catholic)
Saint-Antoine Cathedral, in Longueuil (Roman Catholic)
Saint-Jean-l'Évangéliste Cathedral, in Saint-Jean-sur-Richelieu (Roman Catholic)
Saint-Jérôme Cathedral, in Saint-Jérôme (Roman Catholic)
Saint-Michel Cathedral Basilica, in Sherbrooke (Roman Catholic)
De l'Assomption (Immaculée-Conception) Cathedral, in Trois-Rivières (Roman Catholic)
Basilica Cathedral of St. Cecilia, in Salaberry-de-Valleyfield (Roman Catholic)

Saskatchewan
Holy Family Cathedral (Saskatoon) (Roman Catholic)
Holy Rosary Cathedral (Regina) (Roman Catholic)
Our Lady of Assumption Co-Cathedral (Gravelbourg) (Roman Catholic)
 Sacred Heart Cathedral (Prince Albert) (Roman Catholic)
St. Paul's Cathedral (Regina, Saskatchewan) (Anglican)
St. Paul's Cathedral (Saskatoon) (Roman Catholic) 
St Peter's Church of England Pro-Cathedral (Qu'Appelle) (Anglican)
St. Alban's Cathedral (Prince Albert) (Anglican) 
Cathedral of St. John (Saskatoon) (Anglican)
Holy Trinity Cathedral (Saskatoon) (Ukrainian Orthodox)
Cathedral of St. George (Saskatoon) (Ukrainian Catholic)
St Peter's Co-Cathedral (Muenster) (Roman Catholic)
St George's Cathedral (Regina) (Romanian Orthodox)

Yukon
Christ Church Cathedral (Whitehorse) (Anglican)
Sacred Heart Cathedral (Whitehorse) (Roman Catholic)

See also
Anglican Church of Canada
Anglican Catholic Church of Canada
List of Anglican cathedrals in Canada
Catholicism in Canada
Lists of cathedrals

References

External links

List of Cathedrals in Canada by GCatholic.org
Cathedrals in Quebec
Cathedrals in Canada by The Planet's Cathedrals

Cathedrals
Canada
Cathedrals